The Ewe State of Anlo is headed by the Awoamefia. the traditional political and spiritual leader of the Anlos. The first Awoamefia, Togbi Sri I, instituted a system of selecting rulers in alternating fashion from the Adzovia and Bate clans.  He wanted to ensure that his successor would be Adeladza of the Bate clan instead of a member of his own Adzovia clan.  He did this to reward Adeladza for successfully recovering the Awoamefia stool from King Agorkoli II of Notsie.

List of rulers of the Ewe State of Anlo

Notes

References

See also
Ewe people
Ghana
Gold Coast
Lists of incumbents

Lists of African rulers
Rulers